Tak Dam may refer to:
 Tak Dam, Germi
 Tak Dam, Meshgin Shahr

See also
 Təkdam